Plectocephalus is a genus of plants in the tribe Cardueae within the family Asteraceae.

 Species
 Plectocephalus americanus (Nutt.) D.Don - Mexico (Coahuila, Tamaulipas, Nuevo León), United States (AZ NM TX LA AR MS KS MO IL WI SC NY)
 Plectocephalus cachinalensis (Phil.) N.Garcia & Susanna - Atacama Region in Chile
 Plectocephalus chilensis G.Don ex Loudon - Chile
 Plectocephalus floccosus (Hook. & Arn.) N.Garcia & Susanna - Chile (Coquimbo + Valparaíso)
 Plectocephalus rothrockii (Greenm.) D.J.N.Hind - Mexico (from Chihuahua to Chiapas), United States (AZ NM)
 Plectocephalus tweediei (Hook. & Arn.) N.Garcia & Susanna - Brazil (Rio Grande do Sul), Paraguay (Guairá), Uruguay, Argentina (Buenos Aires, Chaco, Misiones, Corrientes, Entre Ríos, Formosa)
 Plectocephalus varians (A.Rich.) - Ethiopia
 Formerly included
Plectocephalus dracaenoides (Johow) F.H.Hellw. - Centaurodendron dracaenoides Johow

References

Cynareae
Asteraceae genera